Widgery Wharf is an historic wharf in Portland, Maine. Built in the late 1700s, the wharf is named for the Widgery family which controlled the local molasses trade at the time of completion. Members of the Widgery family include Congressman William Widgery. The precise date of the wharf's building is unknown, with possible years including 1760, 1774 and 1777.

As of the 2000s, much of the wharf was covered during the laying of Commercial Street in the 1850s. Despite this, it was one of if not the oldest standing structures in Portland. Nearby Union Wharf was completed in 1793.

References

Transport infrastructure completed in the 18th century
Wharves in the United States
Industrial buildings and structures in Portland, Maine
Port of Portland (Maine)